Gwilym Lee (born 24 November 1983) is a British actor. He is best known for his roles in Jamestown, Midsomer Murders, Top End Wedding, The Great, and for playing guitarist Brian May in the Queen biopic Bohemian Rhapsody.

Early life
Lee was born in Bristol to Welsh parents, Tom and Ceinwen. He has three older siblings: Geraint, Owen and Rhiannon. When he was young the family moved to Sutton Coldfield, West Midlands, although he identifies strongly with his Welsh heritage. He studied English literature at Cardiff University and drama at Guildhall School of Music and Drama, where he received the Guildhall Gold Medal in 2008. Lee lives in London.

Career

Lee joined a drama group as a teen. He then starred in the 1997-1998 television adaptation of the Animal Ark books. Aged 16 he started working on Richard III with the Royal Shakespeare Company. Lee appeared in a leading role in the final series of Land Girls (2011) and had several guest roles on television (including Ashes to Ashes, Fresh Meat, Monroe and Henry V). He has also worked on radio (The Emerald Tiger, The Silver Turk and in an adaptation of The Cruel Sea).

Lee was commended in the 2008 Ian Charleson Awards for his appearance in the National Theatre's production of Oedipus and in 2009 played Laertes to Jude Law's Hamlet in the Donmar West End season.

He won first prize of the 2011 Ian Charleson Award for his role as Edgar in the 2010 King Lear production at the Donmar Warehouse. In 2012 Lee starred in the Donmar Trafalgar Studios production of Aleksei Arbuzov's The Promise.

At Christmas 2013 Lee began a television starring role as DCI Barnaby's new sergeant, DS Charlie Nelson, in the 16th series of Midsomer Murders, which also included the show's 100th episode, partially shot in Denmark in collaboration with the local national broadcasting corporation, DR. In early 2014 he appeared in Versailles at the Donmar Warehouse.

In April 2016 it was announced by ITV that Lee was not returning for season 19 of Midsomer Murders. Lee, on his Twitter account, indicated he would be involved in an upcoming series Jamestown. Lee played guitarist Brian May in the Queen biopic Bohemian Rhapsody (2018), which earned him a nomination for Outstanding Performance by a Cast in a Motion Picture at the 25th Screen Actors Guild Awards.

Filmography

Film

Television

Theatre

Video games

Awards and nominations

References

External links
 
 
 CV at Hamilton Hodell Talent Management 

1983 births
Male actors from Birmingham, West Midlands
21st-century British male actors
English male stage actors
English male television actors
English people of Welsh descent
Ian Charleson Award winners
Living people
Male actors from the West Midlands (county)
People from Sutton Coldfield
Alumni of Cardiff University
Male actors from London